Team records of the Cleveland Guardians baseball team:

Single-season records

Consecutive wins
The Guardians currently hold the American League all time record for consecutive wins at 22 games.

Batting
Batting average: Shoeless Joe Jackson, .408 (1911)
On-base percentage: Tris Speaker, .483 (1920)
Slugging percentage: Albert Belle, .714, (1994)
OPS: Manny Ramírez, 1.154, (2000)
Games played: Leon Wagner, 163 (1964)
At bats:  Joe Carter, 663 (1986)
Runs: Earl Averill, 140 (1931)
Hits: Shoeless Joe Jackson, 233 (1911)
Total bases: Hal Trosky, 405 (1936)
Doubles: George Burns, 64 (1926)
Triples: Shoeless Joe Jackson, 26 (1912)
Home runs: Jim Thome, 52 (2002)
RBI: Manny Ramírez, 165 (1999) 
Bases on balls: Jim Thome, 127 (1999)
Strikeouts: Mike Napoli, 194 (2016)
Stolen bases: Kenny Lofton, 75 (1996)
Singles: Charlie Jamieson, 172 (1923)
Extra base hits: Albert Belle, 103 (1995)
Times on base: Tris Speaker, 316 (1920)
Sacrifice hits: Ray Chapman, 67 (1917)
Sacrifice flies:  Juan González, 16 (2001)
Grounded into double plays:  Julio Franco, 28 (1986)
At bats per strikeout: Joe Sewell, 152 (1925)
At bats per home run: Jim Thome, 9.2 (2002)
Outs: Max Alvis, 515 (1967)
Hitting streak: Nap Lajoie, 31 games (1906)
30+ SB 30+ 2B and 20+ HR in one season, Grady Sizemore (2007)

Pitching
Wins: Jim Bagby, Sr., 31 (1920) 
Strikeouts: Bob Feller, 348 (1946)
Saves: José Mesa, 46 (1995)
ERA: Addie Joss, 1.16 (1908)
Losses: Pete Dowling, 22 (1901)

Career records

Batting
Batting average: Shoeless Joe Jackson, .374
On-base percentage: Tris Speaker, .444
Slugging percentage: Manny Ramirez, .592
OPS: Manny Ramirez, .998
Home runs: Jim Thome, 337
Runs batted in: Earl Averill, 1084
Runs: Earl Averill, 1154
Hits: Nap Lajoie, 2046
Doubles: Tris Speaker, 486
Triples: Earl Averill, 121
Extra base hits: Earl Averill, 724
Total bases: Earl Averill, 3200
Stolen bases: 	Kenny Lofton, 450
Bases on balls: Jim Thome, 997	
Strikeouts: Jim Thome, 1377

Pitching
Wins: Bob Feller, 266
Strikeouts: Bob Feller, 2581
Saves: Cody Allen, 147
Earned run average: Addie Joss, 1.89
Losses: Mel Harder, 186

See also
Cleveland Guardians award winners and league leaders

External links
Cleveland Guardians batting leaders
Cleveland Guardians pitching leaders

Records
Cleveland Indians